Robert Brantley Burrow (June 29, 1934 – January 3, 2019) was an American basketball player.
The son of a lumberjack, Burrow was considered the nation's No. 1 junior college player in 1954  at Lon Morris, where he scored 2,191 points.

Early life 
Reportedly, Adolph Rupp gave Burrow a scholarship without seeing him play in person.
He played collegiately for the University of Kentucky and was selected by the Rochester Royals in the 1956 NBA draft.

Burrow played for the Royals (1956–57) and Minneapolis Lakers (1957–58) in the NBA for a total of 81 games.

Burrow died on January 3, 2019, at age 84.

See also
 List of NCAA Division I men's basketball players with 30 or more rebounds in a game

References

External links

1934 births
2019 deaths
All-American college men's basketball players
American men's basketball players
Basketball players from Arkansas
Centers (basketball)
Kentucky Wildcats men's basketball players
Lon Morris Bearcats basketball players
Minneapolis Lakers players
People from Malvern, Arkansas
Power forwards (basketball)
Rochester Royals draft picks
Rochester Royals players